A list of films produced by the Tollywood (Bengali language film industry) based in Kolkata in the year 2001.

Highest-grossing
 Pratibad

A-Z of films

References

External links
 Tollywood films of 2001 at the Internet Movie Database

2001
Bengali
 
2001 in Indian cinema